Bukowski is a 1973 documentary film produced by Taylor Hackford and directed by Richard Davies.

Plot 
Bukowski follows Los Angeles poet Charles Bukowski to San Francisco on 21 November 1973, for a poetry reading. The full 60-minute documentary begins with footage of Bukowski in his Los Angeles home and neighborhood as he discusses his history as a postal worker as well as his approach to and perspective on poetry. The film then shows him flying with Linda King to San Francisco for the poetry reading followed by interactions with attendees after the show. One night the window of his room is broken during a fight between some guests and then a fight between Charles and Linda causes her to leave. Interviews follow with Liza and Linda about their relationship with Charles. Bukowski is shown betting at the track and explaining his betting strategy.
 
"A cinema-verite portrait of Los Angeles poet Charles Bukowski. At age 53, Bukowski is enjoying his first major success (a San Francisco poetry reading nets him 400 dollars). Until 1969, Bukowski worked in the Post Office to support his writing, and the camera captures his reminiscences of those days as he walks around his Los Angeles neighborhood. Blunt language and a sly appreciation of his life form the core of the program, which includes observations by and about the women in his life" — TV guide, 25 November 1973.

Versions 
A heavily-edited 28-minute version of the footage with alternate scenes and a rearranged structure was aired on PBS as an episode of the KCET series Artbound under the title Bukowski Reads Bukowski on Thursday, October 16, 1975, at 10:30 PM. This version contains less interview footage with Bukowski and his acquaintances but more footage of the reading itself.

Bukowski: Born into This (2003) shows clips, and interviews director, Taylor Hackford.

Recognition 
 local Emmy Award nominee, Los Angeles area
 Silver Reel Award, 1973 San Francisco Film Festival

See also
 List of American films of 1973

References

External links
 
 Bukowski (1973) on YouTube
 Bukowski (1973) on YouTube
 Artbound Series 5 Episode 6: Bukowski Reads Bukowski KCET on YouTube
 Artbound Episode: Charles Bukowski's Odes to Los Angeles (KCET article)

1973 films
1970s English-language films
American documentary films
1973 documentary films
Documentary films about poets
Films shot in San Francisco
Charles Bukowski
1970s American films